"Raining on Sunday" is a song co-written by country music artist Radney Foster and Darrell Brown. It was initially recorded on Foster's 1999 Arista Records album See What You Want to See. Foster's version of the song features a backing vocal from Darius Rucker of the rock band Hootie & the Blowfish.

Keith Urban covered the song for his 2002 album Golden Road. His rendition was released as the album's second single in January 2003.

Personnel
The following musicians perform on Urban's version:
 Keith Urban — lead vocals, lead guitar
 Tom Bukovac — rhythm guitar
 Matt Chamberlain — drums
 Eric Darken — percussion
 Dann Huff — rhythm guitar
 Scotty Huff — background vocals
 Steve Nathan — keyboards
 Jimmie Lee Sloas — bass guitar

Chart performance

Weekly charts

Year-end charts

References

Songs about weather
1999 songs
2003 singles
Radney Foster songs
Keith Urban songs
Music videos directed by Trey Fanjoy
Songs written by Radney Foster
Songs written by Darrell Brown (musician)
Song recordings produced by Dann Huff
Capitol Records Nashville singles
Country ballads